Geissoschizine methyl ether is an alkaloid contained in the kampo medicine Yokukansan. Geissoschizine methyl ether has an antagonistic effect on 5-HT7 receptors.

References

Indole alkaloids
Quinolizidine alkaloids